Pentik Oy is a Finnish family owned company specialized in ceramics and interior decoration. It was founded by Anu Pentik (originally Pentikäinen, née Pasi) and Topi Pentikäinen in 1971. The Pentik brand of the company focuses on textiles and ceramics.

Pentik is considered as one of the most successful industrial art companies in Finland.

History

1971–1999 

Anu Pentik ja Topi Pentikäinen founded Pentik Ky in 1971 at Posio. The couple moved to Posio because he was hired as a teacher. Having assumed the stage name of “Anu Pentik”, she was teaching ceramics at the local adult education college while also selling clay items made by herself at the local Esso gas station. While Pentik oversaw the company's industrial art side, Pentikäinen assumed the mantle of the first managing director of the company. The name ”Pentik” was conceived accidentally, while the newly wedded Anu Pietikäinen was attempting to write her name on a piece of paper that was too small. Aluksi yritys sijaitsi heidän vuokraamansa omakotitalon lastenhuoneessa ja kellarissa, joissa Anu teki keramiikka- ja nahkatöitä. The company's first product line was the Kaamoskivi candleholders. The inspiration behind the product was to create something so disfigured that no one else would attempt to do the same. The company offered the Kaamoskivi candleholders for Stockmann department store to sell. While the purchasing agent found the product hideous, they decided to take a few for sale anyway. The candleholders were instantly sold out and Stockmann made a continuous order for the product line. Revenue for the first year was 7,000 Finnish markkas, and in the following year the revenue exceeded 200,000 markkas.

In 1973, the municipality of Posio had a cottage built for Pentik. Made from dead pine tree, it was to act as a ceramics workshop. The cottage also included a boutique and a cafeteria. The company created its first tableware product line called Hiisi. Revenue for the year was 700,000 markkas.

The ceramics workshop reached its capacity quite quickly, and therefore a new ceramics factory was built in 1974. Pentik's art director Peter Winquist acted as the factory's manager between years 1974–1983. An idea of a cup made from burl with two ears was conceived and the company's revenue reached 1.5 million markkas.

In 1975, a total of three different tableware product lines were launched: Riekko, Sara, and Kanerva. The following year saw the launch of the Pirtti tableware product line, and the company's first shop in Helsinki, which was opened at Esplanadi.

At the end of the 1970s, the company also had a shop specializing in leather products at Esplanadi. The clothes were made from leather pieces left over from the Friitala company's production process. The Neva tableware product line was introduced in 1977, while Inari was launched in 1979.

In the 1980s, a total of 30 people were responsible for manufacturing Pentik's leather clothes, which were sold at New York's luxury department store Saks, among other places. The Pentikäinen family also had their own furniture factory called Artzan, as well as a porcelain studio.

The economic depression in Finland and diminished sales for furniture and leather clothing caused the family company to run into financial troubles. To survive the couple sold their home and all their possessions and moved to live in the ceramics factory. The company relinquish the manufacture of leather products as well as furniture. The bank, their insurance company, and the municipality of Posio all saw bankruptcy as an inevitable outcome, but Pentik asked for more time. Eventually, the company got in the clear once the Aino tableware product line began to sell well. Stores were hesitant to take the company's products on their shelves, however, which lead to Anu Pentik conceiving and realizing a store chain consisting of 36 shops in only three years. The economic depression had left a plethora of cheap, serviceable business spaces unoccupied. Interior design and lifestyle products joined the ceramics, broadening the company's product line.  In 1996, Pentik became a joint-stock company.

2000– 
In 2000, the Pentik Hill Culture Centre was opened in Posio. The company went through generational renewal in 2004, when the ownership of the company transferred to the founders’ children. Their son Pasi Pentikäinen started as the company's managing director, while Topi Pentikäinen moved over to act as the company's chairman of the board. Their daughter, Raisa Bergman, also became a board member. The Anu Pentik Gallery was opened in 2009.

In the beginning of 2010, the company opened their online store which also sold product batches unavailable in their brick-and-mortar shops. About a third of the company's revenue was amassed during the few weeks preceding Christmas, and tableware products formed a quarter of the company's annual revenue. Over 90 percent of the company's customer base were women.

In 2011, Pentik had over 350 employees, out of which 130 were based in Posio. The company had a total of 80 stores in Finland, Sweden, and Norway. Twenty of the stores were franchise operated, while the rest were owned by the company itself. The company had grown organically, without any takeovers. An art exhibition was arranged to commemorate the company's 40th birthday. In addition to their art gallery at Posio, Pentik also had one at Kuusankoski.

In 2017, Anu Pentik's exhibition at the Kunsthalle Helsinki was part of the celebration proceedings of Finland's 100 years of independence. The idea for the exhibition called Three Spaces was born in 2015 at the Kunsthalle, where Pentik perceived three distinct spaces in her mind: earth, sky, and paradise. During the two months of the exhibition, the Kunsthalle had a total of 47 000 visitors, which was one of the largest crowds the exhibition space had had.

In 2018, the Oulu University of Applied Sciences’ mechanical engineers and engineering students developed a cobot to be used at Pentik's factory.

In summer of 2019, Riikka Wulff was nominated as the company's first managing director outside Pentikäinen family. Pasi Pentikäinen succeeded his father as the chairman of the board. The Pentik Hill Culture Centre saw 100 000 annual visitors, and the company's factories produced around 300 000 tableware products.

Between 2019 and 2020, the company's board of directors, retail organization and marketing went through a restructuring process under Wulff's leadership. Store managers were replaced with regional managers, each of whom had from two to five stores under their supervision.

During summer of 2021, Pentik hired its first director to oversee international sales; Niina Nenonen, who's previously been responsible for Marimekko’s marketing endeavours in Japan, would begin with her task in spring 2022. The Kajo tableware product line designed by Anu Pentik was announced in fall.

Organization 

Pentik factory is situated at Posio. Not only is it the world's northernmost ceramics factory, it's also the only one in Finland. The factory produces 300 000 items of tableware on a yearly basis and employs around 30 people. The factory also makes use of robot technology. Any excess heat produced by the factory is being re-used for heating other properties in the area.

In 2020, the company employed about 210 people and its revenue was at 24 million euros. In addition to their brick-and-mortar shops and their online store, Pentik also had three stores in St. Petersburg and an online store operating in Russia in 2021. Some of Pentik's own stores are also outlet stores.

Designers 
The designers at Pentik Oy draw their inspiration from the northern nature. One of them, Minna Niskakangas is an industrial designer and a Master of Arts from the University of Lapland. The Jäkälä series of products has been designed by her, among others.

Anu Pentik also makes exclusive product series for restaurants and private patrons.

The Halla and Riekko tableware product series were designed in the 1970s by Peter Winquist. Small, brown spots in the glazing are a unifying theme between the two series. The spots were originally an accident caused by a higher-than-normal concentration of iron in the clay. When Kaj Franck heard about this during his Posio visit, he advised emphasizing the so-called problem. Winquist had already wanted to make products with spots when he'd been working for Arabia but wasn't authorized to experiment on the matter. The spots in the glazing were created with the help of ilmenite and calcination.

Products and the markets 

In 2020, a third of the company's revenue came from Finland and another third from other countries in the European Union.

Pentik's ceramic products are manufactured in Posio, while most of their textile products are being made in Latvia.

Pentik's stores also sells an assortment of delicacies that are Finnish products, such as chocolate and tea.

Pentik Hill Culture Centre 
Anu Pentik's gallery, the company factory and the factory shop accompanying it, cafeterias, and museums  where one can get acquainted with the Pentik ceramic workshop's history, can all be found in Pentik Hill Culture Centre at Posio. The Pentik Home Museum is the former home of the Pentikäinen family, and some of the company's earliest products, such as ceramics and leatherwear are on display there, along with some tools and materials. The culture centre also includes a coffee cup museum. A 20-metre-wide piece of art, Posion Voima, adorns the art gallery's façade. The piece has drawn inspiration from Antonio Gaudi's architecture.

In 2013, an international ceramics symposium gathering over 20 ceramics artist from all over Europe and Asia, was organized at the Pentik Hill Culture Centre.

In summer 2020, Pentik Hill had over 100 000 visitors. Visit Finland granted the culture centre a Sustainable Travel Finland label. The sustainability aspect in the company's actions is shown for example through their efforts in conserving energy and utilizing local food.

Pentik Manor 
At Topi Pentikäinen's initiative, the family acquired an old reindeer farm as their new home. Situated in Timisjärvi, Perä-Posio, the original manor was deconstructed log by log and then reconstructed. The renovation process took two years. The manor's main building was built in 1862. The estate was bolstered by two other log houses when Kärppä estate's main building and a residential building adjacent to it were transported there from Kuusamo.

The manor is not only a place to live, but also a culture centre, hosting exhibitions and providing the opportunity to observe residential artists in their work. Wild herbs are gathered from the manor's premises, to be dried and sold in Pentik's stores. The manor has two residential artists living and working there every year. The manor's first residential artists were Sungmi Ha from South Korea and Essi Korva from Lapland. Their own exhibition was unveiled in 2015 at the Anu Pentik Gallery. The Pentik Manor Gallery was opened to the public in summer 2016.

Acknowlegments 
 Suomen Kuvalehti chose Pentik as the best family owned company in Finland in 2009
 Anu Pentik became an Honorary Doctor of Arts by the University of Lapland in 2012
 Anu Pentik received the Pro Finlandia honorific in 2014
 In 2020, Pentik was awarded with a lifetime achievement award of Arctic design
In 2021, Anu Pentik won the state prize in design.

Pentik in culture 
Anu Pentik has had private exhibitions in Retretti (2006), Rovaniemi Art Museum Korundi (2013–2014), Kunsthalle Helsinki (Three Spaces, 2017) and at the Wäinö Aaltonen Museum of the Arts (In the beginning there was a seed, 2021), among others. In collaboration with a Korean artist Suku Park, Pentik arranged an exhibition called Vuoropuhelu–Dialogue at Kouvola's Poikilo museum.

Anu Pentik's life story has been told in two separate plays. Written by Eppu Nuotio, Anu Pentik – Nainen, joka loi savesta maailman saw its premiere at Kouvola Theatre, while Rovaniemi Theatre’s play Anu P. premiered in fall 2021.

Sculptor Kerttu Horila has made sculptures of both Anu Pentik and Topi Pentikäinen.

References

External links 

 Pentik website
Pentik Hill Culture Centre
Pentik Manor

Posio
Manufacturing companies of Finland
Ceramics manufacturers